Ženski košarkaški klub Spartak, commonly referred to as ŽKK Spartak Subotica, is a women's professional basketball team based in Subotica, Serbia. They are currently competing in the First League of Serbia.

History

Arena
Sport Palace Subotica is a multi-purpose indoor arena located in the Subotica and it has a capacity of 3,500 seats.

Players

Notable former players
Tijana Ajduković
Sanja Orozović
Dunja Prčić
Jovana Rad
Iva Prčić
Adrijana Knežević

External links
 Official page on facebook.com
 Profile on eurobasket.com
 Profile on srbijasport.net

 
Spartak Subotica
Sport in Subotica
Women's basketball teams in Yugoslavia
Basketball teams established in 1945